Ross Mathews (born September 24, 1979) is an American television host and personality. He first rose to fame as an intern and a correspondent for The Tonight Show with Jay Leno; he was known as "Ross the Intern" on air.

Mathews has appeared on Celebrity Fit Club, The Insider, Celebrity Big Brother, and as a weekly panelist on Chelsea Lately. He is a judge on RuPaul's Drag Race, hosts a weekly podcast with Westwood One Studios, and assists with hosting The Drew Barrymore Show. He has been a co-host on Live from E! and correspondent on The Jay Leno Show.

Early life
Raised in Mount Vernon, Washington, Mathews graduated from Mount Vernon High School and graduated from the University of La Verne, in La Verne, California in 2002. He majored in communications and competed in speech and debate competitions.

Career
Mathews began as an intern on The Tonight Show with Jay Leno. Beginning in December 2001 he covered movie premieres, the Academy Awards, two Winter Olympic Games, and other events.

Mathews has contributed commentary to the E! networks various 101... specials, and appeared as a weekly panelist on E's late night talk show Chelsea Lately. He appeared on the fifth season of VH1's reality television show, Celebrity Fit Club. During the course of the show, which premiered in April 2007, Mathews lost more than 40 lbs. (18 kg) and helped his team win the grand prize. He was also a guest host on The View on July 17, 2007.

Mathews appeared as a celebrity mob member on seven episodes of NBC's prime time game show 1 vs. 100 in early 2008. In 2009, he was a contributing correspondent on The Insider, and hosted a web show on The Insider called Inside Dish With Ross Mathews; he took viewers behind the scenes as an "outsider" in Hollywood. Inside Dish became the official online web-shows for CBS's Big Brother and The Amazing Race. Also in 2009, he co-hosted GSN's Big Saturday Night, a weekly game show. His other 2009 appearances included The Howard Stern Show and the 2009 Game Show Awards with Diane.

Mathews joined the panel of judges for RuPaul’s drag race with occasional appearances in the earlier seasons and more frequent appearances beginning in Season 7.
In 2010, Mathews joined the E! Network's red carpet team, filling in for Ryan Seacrest as co-host with  Giuliana Rancic for E! Live From the Red Carpet coverage of the 2011 Screen Actors Guild Awards, the 2010 Emmy Awards, the 2011 Golden Globe Awards, and the 2011 Academy Awards.

In January 2011, Mathews starred in a pilot that he produced and co-wrote with fellow Chelsea Lately round table regular Heather McDonald. Titled Love or Hate, the pilot was made for the E! Network and was executive produced by Chelsea Handler and her company Borderline Amazing Productions.
He also appeared in the E! Network's After Lately, a show about the behind the scenes of Chelsea Lately. By September 2011, Mathews had left The Tonight Show returning for guest appearances including the "Woulda, Coulda, Shoulda" skit on December 14, 2011.

Mathews appeared in the fourth episode of the Bravo series Interior Therapy with Jeff Lewis in 2012, in which Lewis redesigned his and his boyfriend's garage.

On May 7, 2013, Mathews released his book Man Up! Tales of My Delusional Self-Confidence. He was the host of Hello Ross, an interactive talk show on E! from September 6, 2013, until May 16, 2014. In 2015, he and Carson Kressley were named as new regular judges for the 7th season of RuPaul's Drag Race. At the end of 2015, Mathews began filling in as a guest host on Hollywood Today Live, which is syndicated on Fox. He became a permanent host on January 4, 2016. He also had a lead role in the movie Pup Star. The sequel, Pup Star: Better 2Gether, premiered the following year. He guest-starred as himself in an episode of Mike Tyson Mysteries titled "Unsolved Situations" in 2016.

In 2017, he was the commentator of the Eurovision Song Contest 2017 together with Michelle Visage live for Logo TV. He also commented alongside Shangela on the Logo TV broadcast of the Eurovision Song Contest 2018 final.

In 2018, Mathews was announced as one of the eleven houseguests competing on the first American edition of Celebrity Big Brother. He finished in 2nd place, winning $50,000, and was voted as America's Favorite Houseguest earning an additional prize of $25,000. He  appeared in the second season as part of a Head of Household competition.

On November 28, 2019, Mathews was a field reporter for Verizon 360 at the 93rd Macy's Thanksgiving Day Parade. Since fall 2020, he has appeared on the "Drews News" segment of the Drew Barrymore show and has been hosting his own podcast, Straight Talk with Ross Mathews. In 2021, he appeared as a panelist on the comedy series, Adorableness on MTV.

Personal life
Mathews is openly gay. From 2008 to 2018, he had a relationship with stylist Salvador Camarena.  In 2013, the couple appeared in an episode of House Hunters while shopping for a home in Palm Springs. On February 23, 2021, Mathews announced his engagement to Dr. Wellinthon García, a Long Island educational administrator. On May 7, 2022, Mathews and García married at a ceremony in Puerto Vallarta, Mexico.

Filmography

Film
 The Bitch Who Stole Christmas (2021)

Television

Bibliography

References

External links

 Official website
 
 Inside Dish w/ Ross Mathews

1979 births
Living people
American bloggers
21st-century American memoirists
American reporters and correspondents
American gay writers
American LGBT broadcasters
LGBT people from Washington (state)
Participants in American reality television series
People from Mount Vernon, Washington
University of La Verne alumni
Writers from Washington (state)
Gay comedians
The Tonight Show with Jay Leno
American male bloggers
Judges in American reality television series
American LGBT comedians